Parima may refer to:

Lake Parime, a legendary lake in South America, reputedly the location of the fabled city of El Dorado, sought by many European explorers but never found.
Parima Tapirapecó National Park, Venezuela
Parima River, Venezuela
Parima Mountains, Venezuela
Parima (d. 1886), second to last monarch of the island of Rapa Iti